Oldham Coliseum Theatre is a theatre in Oldham, Greater Manchester, England.

Found on Fairbottom Street in the town centre, Oldham's Coliseum is a repertory theatre which celebrated its centenary in 1987. Its interior makes it a great period classic in theatre terms, and has seen the likes of local performers such as Eric Sykes, Charlie Chaplin, Dame Thora Hird and Dora Bryan tread its boards.

The history of the theatre can be traced back to 1885.  It was originally intended to be a permanent home for the Great American Circus, then based on Henshaw Street, but the owner of the circus, Mr Myers, was unable to pay for the completed work.  Following a court case, ownership of the building was granted to Thomas Whittaker, the carpenter who had performed the work.  Whittaker decided to open the Coliseum as a theatre and the first production was called Culver's Circus. Other notable owners of the theatre include Paul Yates, founder and owner of Yates' Wine Lodge.

During its time, the Coliseum has opened and closed doors on numerous occasions.  In 1911, in a bid to compete with the rising trend of cinema, the theatre began to show silent films in between productions.  In 1918, it was bought by Dobie's Electric Theatres.  In 1931 it was converted into a cinema, but its life as a cinema was short-lived as the recession of 1932 hit hard and it closed within 12 months.  It stood empty until 1939 when a local group called The Oldham Playgoers Club were successful enough to sign the lease on the building and stage their own productions.

The theatre is said to be one of the most haunted theatres in Britain.  In 1947, actor Harold Norman, who was non-superstitious and refused to follow theatrical tradition when it came to The Scottish Play, died after being stabbed by a sword whilst playing the title character in Macbeth.

The theatre featured in a 2004 episode of the TV series Most Haunted.

The theatre was renovated in 2012.

Following funding being cut by Arts Council England in late 2022, the board of trustees announced on 14th February that it wasn’t financially viable to continue to run the theatre full time so they were entering a period of consultation with the intention of closing on 31st March 2023.

In mid March 2023 it was announced that the theatre would close at the end of the month.

External links
 Official website

References

Theatres in Greater Manchester
Buildings and structures in Oldham
1885 establishments in England
Producing theatres in England
2023 disestablishments in England